LaCenter, formerly and often informally written as La Center, is a home rule-class city in Ballard County, Kentucky, in the United States. The population was 1,009 at the 2010 census, making it the most populous community in the county. It is part of the Paducah micropolitan area.

History

The Kentucky Secretary of State is unclear upon the city's date of incorporation, but the LaCenter Woman's Club states it was originally named Merriville after the daughter of Maggie Davis, the land owner who sold the property for the new city to its developer, the La Center Land Company, in 1902.  After the Postal Service rejected this name for the new post office, the postmaster requested "LaCentre" for the city's central location within Ballard County, and later settled for "LaCenter." One of the land developers, Stokely T. Payne, may have suggested the name, claiming the new city to be the "center of the universe," and possibly in the hopes that it would someday become the county seat.

Geography
LaCenter is located northeast of Wickliffe at  (37.074782, -88.975091). It is geographically significant because of its proximity to the confluence of the Ohio and Mississippi rivers. The city is concentrated primarily around the intersection of U.S. Route 60, which connects LaCenter with Paducah to the east and Wickliffe to the southwest, and Kentucky Route 358.

Demographics

As of the census of 2000, there were 1,038 people, 419 households, and 261 families residing in the city. The racial makeup of the city was 89.40% White, 9.06% African American, 0.10% Native American, 0.29% Asian, and 1.16% from two or more races. Hispanic or Latino of any race were 0.58% of the population.

There were 419 households, out of which 29.4% had children under the age of 18 living with them, 45.8% were married couples living together, 13.1% had a female householder with no husband present, and 37.7% were non-families. 35.1% of all households were made up of individuals, and 21.2% had someone living alone who was 65 years of age or older. The average household size was 2.26 and the average family size was 2.90.

In the city, the population was spread out, with 23.2% under the age of 18, 7.0% from 18 to 24, 23.9% from 25 to 44, 19.3% from 45 to 64, and 26.6% who were 65 years of age or older. The median age was 42 years. For every 100 females, there were 80.5 males. For every 100 females age 18 and over, there were 71.0 males.

The median income for a household in the city was $27,188, and the median income for a family was $36,250. Males had a median income of $32,813 versus $20,417 for females. The per capita income for the city was $14,317. About 13.9% of families and 16.5% of the population were below the poverty line, including 25.9% of those under age 18 and 12.2% of those age 65 or over.

Notable people
Bob DeWeese, served as a Republican member of the Kentucky House of Representatives from 1993 to 2016, representing the 48th district

Emily Nowselski - College campus ministry leader at Florida Atlantic University. Provided daily lunches to starving college students, Bible studies, Free Disney trips, support and a lending ear to any FAU student. Died August 1st,2022 at 97 years old. Married to Tony Nowselski. Buried at Lacenter cemetery.

References

External links

City of LaCenter Elected Officials at Ballard County website

Cities in Ballard County, Kentucky
Cities in Kentucky
Paducah micropolitan area
Populated places established in 1903
1903 establishments in Kentucky